Cazzano di Tramigna is a comune (municipality) in the Province of Verona in the Italian region Veneto, located about  west of Venice and about  northeast of Verona.

Cazzano di Tramigna borders the following municipalities: Colognola ai Colli, Illasi, Montecchia di Crosara, San Giovanni Ilarione, Soave, and Tregnago.

References

Cities and towns in Veneto